Heterocnephes is a genus of moths of the family Crambidae.

Species
Heterocnephes apicipicta Inoue, 1963
Heterocnephes delicata Swinhoe, 1917
Heterocnephes lymphatalis (Swinhoe, 1889)
Heterocnephes scapulalis Lederer, 1863
Heterocnephes vicinalis Snellen, 1880

References

Pyraustinae
Crambidae genera
Taxa named by Julius Lederer